

Wulfsige (died ) was a medieval Bishop of Lichfield.

Wulfsige was consecrated between 857 and 862 and died between 866 and 869.

Citations

References

External links
 

9th-century English bishops
Anglo-Saxon bishops of Lichfield
860s deaths
Year of birth unknown

Year of death uncertain